1619 Ueta, provisional designation , is a stony asteroid from the inner regions of the asteroid belt, approximately 11 kilometers in diameter. It was discovered on 11 October 1953, by Japanese astronomer Tetsuyasu Mitani at Kyoto University's Kwasan Observatory, near Kyoto, Japan. It was named after the former director of the discovering observatory.

Classification and orbit 

Ueta is a S-type asteroid, that orbits the Sun in the inner main-belt at a distance of 1.8–2.6 AU once every 3 years and 4 months (1,225 days). Its orbit has an eccentricity of 0.18 and an inclination of 6° with respect to the ecliptic.

Uetas observation arc begins 22 years prior to its official discovery observation with a precovery taken at Lowell Observatory in 1931.

Rotation period and pole 

Several rotational lightcurves of Ueta were obtained from photometric observations. Best rated lightcurves were obtained by astronomers Robert Stephens and David Higgins in September 2009, securing an identical rotation period of 2.720 hours with a brightness variation of 0.35 and 0.39 magnitude, respectively. Modeled lightcurves from various photometric data sources also gave a similar period of 2.717943 and 2.718238 hours.

Diameter and albedo 

According to the survey carried out by NASA's Wide-field Infrared Survey Explorer with its subsequent NEOWISE mission, Ueta measures between 7.13 and 9.93 kilometers in diameter, and its surface has an albedo between 0.251 and 0.479. The Collaborative Asteroid Lightcurve Link assumes a standard albedo for stony asteroids of 0.20 and calculates a diameter of 11.04 kilometers with an absolute magnitude of 12.15.

Naming 

Ueta was named by the discoverer for the former Director of Kwasan Observatory (also see ) who encouraged him to keep on with his observations of minor planets and comets. The official  was published by the Minor Planet Center on 1 February 1965.

References

External links 
 Kwasan Observatory – Kyoto University
 Kwasan and Hida observatories
 Asteroid Lightcurve Database (LCDB), query form (info )
 Dictionary of Minor Planet Names, Google books
 Discovery Circumstances: Numbered Minor Planets (1)-(5000)  – Minor Planet Center
 
 

001619
Discoveries by Tetsuyasu Mitani
Named minor planets
001619
19531011